America Township is a township in Plymouth County, Iowa, in the United States. The elevation of America Township is listed as 1,332 feet above sea level. The population of America Township in 2018 was 10,244.

References

Townships in Iowa
1882 establishments in Iowa
Populated places established in 1882